is a Japanese professional wrestler and former mixed martial artist. She is best known for her extensive tenure in Ring of Honor, where she was the inaugural and longest reigning Women of Honor Champion.

Early life 
As a young woman, Sakai practiced judo. From 1995 to 1997, she halted her practice of judo to work with senior citizens at the Kasugamachi Care Center in Kanazawa, Ishikawa.

Professional wrestling career

Japan 
Sakai became involved in wrestling when her friend and fellow judo practitioner, Megumi Yabushita, invited her to join the wrestling sport. Sakai trained under Jaguar Yokota and made her debut on April 20, 1997 with the Yoshimoto Ladies Pro Wrestling promotion, facing Yabushita in the Korakuen Hall in Tokyo. She went on to form a tag team with Yabushita named .

Later in 1997, Sakai began wrestling for Yokota's JDStar promotion, where she won both the JDStar Junior Championship and the JDStar Queen of the Ring Championship. She also won the Women's Championship of the affiliated American Wrestling Federation and the Tag Team Championship of the affiliated Trans-World Wrestling Federation. In 1999, she suffered a broken leg while wrestling Lioness Asuka. While rehabilitating, Sakai became enamored of American professional wrestling, and resolved to one day wrestle in the United States.

While in Japan, Sakai faced several prominent male Japanese wrestlers, including Dick Togo, The Great Sasuke and Jinsei Shinzaki. She furthered her training under Bison Kimura, Cooga and Lioness Asuka.

United States

Independent wrestling (2002–present)
Sakai wrestled her first match in the United States in 2002. In May 2002, she began a three-month tour of the US, where she feuded with Mercedes Martinez in New England Championship Wrestling. While in the promotion, she and Martinez traded the New England Championship Wrestling North American Women's Championship, but Sakai was champion when she returned to Japan. In 2003, she left JDStar and relocated to the United States.

On April 17, 2005, Sakai organised "WE LOVE SABU", a pair of shows held at the Differ Ariake Arena in Tokyo. "WE LOVE SABU" was organised in support of Terry "Sabu" Brunk, an American wrestler who had been afflicted with a serious virus in the summer of 2004, with the proceeds of the show going towards paying Sabu's medical bills. The show featured Frontier Martial-Arts Wrestling alumni such as Masato Tanaka and Extreme Championship Wrestling alumni such as The Sandman. Sabu eventually made a complete recovery, returning to the ring on May 21, 2005.

In 2009, Sakai began training with Brazilian jiu-jitsu black belt Bill Scott. She currently holds a blue belt.

In 2012, Sakai joined Kurt Pellegrino's Mixed Martial Arts Academy in Belmar, NJ to better her BJJ and pursue her MMA career.

On August 9, 2019, Sakai defeated PCW Ultra Woman’s Champion Tessa Blanchard for the title.

Ring of Honor

Early appearances (2002–2005) 
Sakai first appeared in Ring of Honor (ROH) in June 2002 and defeated Simply Luscious in the very first women's match on an ROH card. She returned in December 2003 and January 2004, defeating Alison Danger and losing to Alexis Laree and April Hunter. She returned to ROH on August 20, 2005, losing to Lacey at Do or Die 5.

Re-launched of Women of Honor division (2014–2017) 
Sakai returned to ROH in 2014 and been performing regularly for ROH since 2015 for its Women of Honor division. On September 26, 2015, Sakai faced Veda Scott in a losing effort as part of "Women of Honor Wednesday" program. Sakai made her televised debut on the June 26, 2016, episode of ROH TV, where Sakai alongside Mary Dobson and Thunderkitty faced the team of Allysin Kay, Amber Gallows  and Scott in a losing effort.

Women of Honor World Champion (2018) 
Since 2018, Sakai took part in the tournament to crown the inaugural Women of Honor World champion, where she won in the first round (at ROH 16th Anniversary Show) against Hana Kimura. Sakai became the inaugural Women of Honor champion at Supercard of Honor XII after defeating Kelly Klein. During her reign, Sakai was able to retain her title against various competitors such as Madison Rayne and Tenille Dashwood. On Finale Battle, Sakai lost the championship to Klein in a Four Corner Survival match which also involved Karen Q and Rayne.

Various competitors and heel turn (2019–2020) 
On January 26, 2019, she received her first Women of Honor World Championship match since losing the title, when she challenged Klein, but was unsuccessful. On January 11, 2020, at the Saturday Night at Center Stage, Sakai teamed with Nicole Savoy when they faced The Allure (Angelina Love and Mandy Leon) in a losing effort. After the match, Sakai attacked Savoy out of frustration, turning heel in the process. The following day, Sakai defeated Savoy in their second encounter against each other.

Return after COVID-19 pandemic (2021) 
With ROH returning after the COVID-19 pandemic, Sakai made had her first match over a year on May 5, 2021, where she defeated Vita VonStarr, working as a face again. On July 7, Sakai received a "Ticket to Gold" to compete at a tournament to crown the inaugural ROH Women's World Champion. On July 30, Sakai lost to Rok-C at the first round of the tournament.

After her loss to Rok-C in the ROH Women's World title tournament and the company ROH being sold to Tony Khan she has not been seen in Ring of Honor.

Mixed martial arts 

Sakai made her mixed martial arts debut on October 14, 2006, fighting American kickboxer Amy Davis in a bout promoted by Tom Supnet of the "Primal Tribe Fighting Club" as part of the Xtreme Fight Series II event. The bout ended in a no contest at the end of the first three-minute long round after Davis suffered an arm injury and was unable to continue as a result of an armbar applied by Sakai.

Mixed martial arts record 

|Loss
|align=center|2–4
|Jamie Lowe
|TKO (punches)
|Cage Fury Fighting Championships 19
|
|align=center|3
|align=center|3:32
|Atlantic City, New Jersey, United States
|
|-
|Loss
|align=center|2–3
|Iman Achhal
|TKO (punches)
|Ultimate Warrior Challenge 7
|
|align=center|2
|align=center|2:30
|Fairfax, Virginia, United States
|
|-
|Loss
|align=center|2–2
|Jessica Penne
|Submission (armbar)
|Fatal Femmes Fighting 2
|
|align=center|3
|align=center|0:33
|Compton, California, United States
|
|-
|Win
|align=center|2–1
|Amber McCoy
|Submission (rear-naked choke)
|Brawl at Bourbon Street
|
|align=center|1
|align=center|0:18
|Illinois, United States
|
|-
|Loss
|align=center|1–1
|Jessica Aguilar
|Decision (unanimous)
|Combat Fighting Championship 3
|
|align=center|3
|align=center|5:00
|Orlando, Florida, United States
|
|-
|Win
|align=center|1–0
|Melissa Vasquez
|Submission (armbar)
|Freestyle Combat Challenge 25
|
|align=center|1
|align=center|N/A
|Kenosha, Wisconsin, United States
|
|-
| NC
|align=center|0–0
|Amy Davis
|NC (confusion over rules)
|Xtreme Fight Series 2
|
|align=center|1
|align=center|3:0
|Boise, Idaho, United States
|

Championships and accomplishments 
 All Japan Women's Pro-Wrestling
 AJW Tag Team Championship (1 time) – with Yuko Kosugi
 American Wrestling Federation
 AWF Women's Championship (2 times)
 JDStar
 JDStar Junior Championship (1 time)
 JDStar Queen of the Ring Championship (1 time)
 New England Championship Wrestling
 NECW North American Women's Championship (1 time)
 PCW ULTRA
 PCW ULTRA Women's Championship (1 time)
 Pro Wrestling Illustrated
 Ranked No. 12 of the top 50 female singles wrestlers in the PWI Female 50 in 2018
 Pro Wrestling Unplugged
 PWU Women's Championship (1 time)
 Pro Wrestling World-1
 Pro Wrestling World-1 Women's Championship (1 time)
 Ring of Honor
 Women of Honor World Championship (1 time, inaugural)
 Women of Honor Championship Tournament (2018)
 ROH Year-End Award (1 time)
 WOH Wrestler of the Year (2018)
 Trans-World Wrestling Federation
 TWWF Tag Team Championship (3 times) – with Cooga (1), Hiroyo Mutoh (1) and Megumi Yabushita (1)
 Valkyrie Women's Professional Wrestling
 International Joshi Grand Prix (2014)
 Women's Extreme Wrestling
 WEW Tag Team Championship (1 time) – with Annie Social

References

Notes 
 Bobish, Seguin Win at XFS II
 Sumie Sakai at Bodyslamming.com
 Sumie Sakai at Cagematch.net
 Sumie Sakai at GloryWrestling.com 
 Sumie Sakai at Puroresuya.com
 Sumie Sakai Debuts in America
 WE LOVE SABU 4/17/05 Shows

External links 
 Sumie Sakai at Sherdog.com
 Sumie Sakai at WExtremeW.com 
 Sumie's Myspace Page

1971 births
Japanese female professional wrestlers
Japanese female judoka
Japanese female mixed martial artists
Mixed martial artists utilizing wrestling
Mixed martial artists utilizing judo
Living people
Sportspeople from Mie Prefecture
Sportspeople from Philadelphia
20th-century professional wrestlers
21st-century professional wrestlers
Women of Honor World Champions